William Maynard, 1st Baron Maynard  (10 July 1586 – 19 December 1640) of Easton Lodge, Little Easton, Essex was an English Member of Parliament.

Biography 
He was the eldest son of Sir Henry Maynard of Easton Lodge and educated at the embassy in Paris (1598), St. John’s College, Cambridge (awarded MA, 1608) and entered the Inner Temple (1611). He was knighted in 1609 and succeeded his father in 1610.

He was the Member of Parliament (MP) for Penryn (1609–1611) and Chippenham in 1614. He was created a baronet in 1611, Baron Maynard of Wicklow in the Irish peerage in 1620 and Baron Maynard of Estaines ad Turrim (Little Easton) in the English peerage in 1628.

He was Lord Lieutenant of Essex (6 August 1635 – 17 December 1640), Lord Lieutenant of Cambridgeshire {17 June 1640 – 17 December 1640} and Custos Rotulorum of Essex for life in 1640.

He married twice. Firstly in 1608, he married Frances, the daughter of William Cavendish, 1st Baron Cavendish of Hardwick, later 1st Earl of Devonshire. Their 3 children predeceased him. He then married in 1615 Anne, the daughter of Sir Anthony Everard of Great Waltham, Essex. They had 2 sons and 5 daughters. He was succeeded by his only surviving son William Maynard, 2nd Baron Maynard.

References

http://thepeerage.com/p1215.htm#i12150

External links
 Portrait of Frances Lady Maynard (1595-1613), Hardwick Hall, NT

|-

1586 births
1640 deaths
Alumni of St John's College, Cambridge
Members of the Inner Temple
Barons in the Peerage of Ireland
Peers of Ireland created by James I
1
Peers of England created by Charles I
Members of the pre-1707 English Parliament for constituencies in Cornwall
English MPs 1604–1611
English MPs 1614
Lord-Lieutenants of Essex
Lord-Lieutenants of Cambridgeshire